Robert Jenner may refer to:

 Robert Jenner (ice hockey), English ice hockey player
 Robert Jenner (MP) (1584–1651), English merchant and politician
 Robert Francis Jenner (1802–1860), High Sheriff of Glamorgan